Erica Wheeler (born October 24 in Maryland) is an American folk singer-songwriter. She lives in western Massachusetts. Growing up in the suburbs of Washington, D.C., she was exposed to traditional folk and bluegrass music in surrounding Virginia, West Virginia, and Maryland, which influenced her later style. She attended Hampshire College in Amherst, Massachusetts. Her songs such as "Rivers", "Spirit Lake", and "Maryland Country Road" draw on the natural beauty of the surroundings where she has lived.

Erica also offers workshops and recordings which are intended to foster the emotional connection between people and place.

In March 2008 she released "Good Summer Rain" which fuses the roots Americana sounds of dobro, mandolin, guitar, and drums with the piano and upright bass. This album is sponsored by The Trust for Public Land.

Discography
 From That Far (1992)
 The Harvest (1996)
 Three Wishes (1999)
 Wonderland (2000)
 Almost Like Tonight (live) (2005)
 Good Summer Rain (2008)

References

External links
 Official web site
 Soulful Landscape Workshops and Keynote Concerts

American women singer-songwriters
American folk singers
Hampshire College alumni
Living people
Singer-songwriters from Maryland
Year of birth missing (living people)
Signature Sounds artists
21st-century American women singers
21st-century American singers